The following is a list of learning management systems (LMS).

Open source 

 aTutor
 Chamilo
 Claroline
 Canvas
 eFront
 ILIAS
 LAMS
 LON-CAPA
 Moodle
 Open edX
 OLAT
 OpenOLAT
 Sakai
 SWAD
 WeBWorK

SAAS/Cloud 

 e-khool LMS
 CallidusCloud
 Cornerstone OnDemand Inc.
 DoceboLMS
 eFront (eLearning software)
 EthosCE
 Google Classroom
 Grovo
 Growth Engineering
 Halogen Software
 Inquisiq R3

imc Learning Suite
 itslearning
 Kannu
 MapleLMS
Open edX
 OpenLearning
Udutu

Proprietary 

 Blackboard Learn
 CERTPOINT Systems Inc.
 D2L (originally Desire2Learn, creator of Brightspace)
 eCollege
 Edmodo
 EduNxt
 Engrade
 GlobalScholar
 Glow (Scottish Schools National Intranet)
 HotChalk
 Kahoot!
 Kannu
 SAP
 Skillsoft
 Spongelab
 SuccessFactors
 SumTotal Systems
 Taleo
 Teams
 Uzity

Historical 

 ANGEL Learning (acquired by Blackboard in May 2009)
 Click2Learn and Docent merged to become SumTotal Systems in 2004
 CourseInfo LLC (precursor company to Blackboard, which became Blackboard's core technology, founded by Stephen Gilfus
 Elluminate (acquired by Blackboard in 2010)
 Learn.com (acquired by Taleo in 2010)
 PeopleSoft (acquired by Oracle in 2005)
 Plateau Systems (acquired by Successfactors in 2011)
 Softscape (acquired by SumTotal in 2010)
 SuccessFactors (acquired by SAP in 2012)
 SumTotal (acquired by Skillsoft in 2014)
 Taleo (acquired by Oracle in 2012)
 WebCT (acquired by Blackboard in 2005)

References

Lists of software